Daniel Heidkamp (born 1980) is an American figurative painter.

Education 
Heidkamp received his BFA from School of the Museum of Fine Arts, Boston, MA, and his MFA from Tufts University, Medford, MA in 2003.
In 2001, Heidkamp was enrolled in the International Exchange Program at the University of Westminster, London, England.

Work
Daniel Heidkamp was born in Wakefield, Massachusetts in 1980. Heidkamp is an American contemporary figurative painter. Painter Daniel Heidkamp follows in the traditions of Edward Hopper, David Hockney, and Peter Doig. His subject matter ranges from woodland scenes from his native New England, to Brooklyn interiors, to brightly colored semi-abstract landscapes, as exemplified by his Bounce House series. The artist begins by sourcing images and then reworking them in al fresco and studio studies before creating his canvases with thickly built impasto adding detail to his oil compositions. “My source material comes from 'on-the-spot' painting,” Heidkamp has explained. “I sit outside with my canvas on the ground and try to capture moments when the ordinary world appears entirely otherworldly.” Heidkamp’s work will be included in a group exhibition at the Metropolitan Museum of Art in New York in June 2017.
Heidkamp lives and works in Brooklyn, New York City, New York.

Exhibitions 
Solo exhibitions
Wavelength, LOYAL, Stockholm, Sweden, 2018 
Jaws Dropping, The Journal Gallery, New York, NY, 2016
New York, New Work, Half Gallery, New York, NY, 2016
Pump The Peninsula, LOYAL, Stockholm, Sweden, 2016
Daniel Heidkamp, Pace Prints, New York, NY, 2015 
Barbizon Beauty School, Half Gallery, New York, NY, 2015
Daniel Heidkamp, White Columns, New York, NY, 2014
Trapped Under Nice, LaMontagne Gallery, Boston, MA, 2011
The Arrangement, LaMontagne Gallery, Boston, MA, 2009
Daniel Heidkamp, BUIA Gallery, New York, NY, 2008
Selected group exhibitions
Jane Freilicher, Mira Dancy, Daniel Heidkamp, Derek Eller Gallery, New York City, New York, 2017
FIGURATIVELY: Jane Corrigan, Daniel Heidkamp, Ella Kruglyanskaya, Aliza Nisenbaum, and Daniel Rios Rodriguez, Curated by Matthew Higgs, Wilkinson Gallery, London, UK, 2015 
The Guston Effect, Steven Zevitas Gallery, Boston, MA, 2015
20 X 16, Morgan Lehman Gallery, New York, NY, 2015
SPEARS, LOYAL, Stockholm, Sweden 
Let's Talk Postmodernity, Robert Blumenthal Gallery, New York, NY, 2015 
Eagles II, Marlborough Madrid, Madrid, Spain, 2015
Ticket to Reality: Daniel Heidkamp, Alice Neel, Henry Taylor, Bob Thompson, Marlborough Chelsea, New York, NY, 2015
The Great Figure: Daniel Heidkamp, Lily Ludlow, Keith Mayerson, Dana Schutz, Henry Taylor, and Torey Thornton, The Journal Gallery, New York, NY, 2014
Some Thoughts About Marks: Theodora Allen Patrick Berran Daniel Heidkamp Michael Hunter Lui Shtini, Jack Hanley Gallery - New York, New York, NY, 2014
Don’t Look Now, curated by Jesse Greenberg and MacGregor Harp, Zach Feuer Gallery, New York, NY, 2014
Draw Gym, 247365, New York, NY Suddenness + Certainty, Robert Miller Gallery, New York, NY, 2013
Woods, Lovely, Dark, And Deep, DC Moore Gallery, New York, NY, 2013
Conveniently Located, 247365, New York, NY, 2013 
Disquietude, Geoffrey Young Gallery, Great Barrington, MA, 2012
DNA Summer Artists' Residency Exhibition, 2012
DNA Gallery, Provincetown, MA, 2012
The Double Dirty Dozen (& Friends), Freight + Volume, New York, NY, 2012
Epiphanic Glow, Geoffrey Young Gallery, Great Barrington, MA New York, 2012
– New Tendencies, Marianne Friis Gallery, Copenhagen Mie: A Portrait By 35 Artists, Freight + Volume, New York, NY, 2012
Paper A - Z, Sue Scott Gallery, New York, NY, 2011
Last Thursday, LaMontagne Gallery, Boston, MA, 2010
A Lettuce Slaughter in the Woods, Real Fine Arts, New York, NY, 2010
Small Oil Paintings, Galerie Mikael Andersen - Berlin, Germany, 2010
Big Picture, Priska C. Juschka Fine Art, New York, NY, 2010
Behind The Green Door, DNA Gallery, Provincetown, MA, 2010
The Irascible Assholes, Gallery poulsen Contemporary Fine Arts, Copenhagen, DK, 2010 
Three Painters, BUIA Gallery, New York, NY, 2009
In Your Face, BUIA Gallery, New York, NY, 2008
Cusp, DNA Gallery, Provincetown, MA, 2008
ambivalent figuration; people, Samson Projects, Boston, MA, 2008

Further reading
McMahon, Katherine, "Habitat: Daniel Heidkamp ", Art News, November 20, 2015 
Herbert, Martin, "Four Painting Shows", Frieze Magazine, August 19, 2015 
Lehrer, “Artist Daniel Heidkamp Paints From Life in New Show "Barbizon Beauty School””, Forbes Magazine, March 11, 2015’’ 
Freeman and Alanna Martinez, “12 Things to Do in New York’s Art World Before March 16”, Observer, March 9, 2015’’
Messinger, Kate, "20 Art Shows To See This Spring In NYC", Paper Magazine, March 4, 2015 
Zevitas, Steven, "15 Painters To Watch In 2015", New American Paintings, December 16, 2014 
Soboleva, Elena, "What It's Like to Be the Subject of a Painting in Daniel Heidkamp's Exhibition at White Columns", Complex, July 22, 2014 
‘’Roberta Smith, “Daniel Heidkamp”, The New York Times, July 10, 2014’’
“Daniel Heidkamp Finds Greatness in Normalcy”, BlouinArtInfo, June 26, 2014’’
Anderson, “Whiff of Secret Knowledge: An Interview with Daniel Heidkamp”, Beautiful Savage, June 17, 2014’’
Heidkamp at White Columns”, Art in America, 2014’’
Powers, Bill, “Daniel Heidkamp Euro Tripping, Muse Magazine, 2014 
Mayerson, “Daniel Heidkamp”, Exhibition A’’ 
Perrine, Forrest, "Daniel Heidkamp’s Contemporary Impressionism", Beautiful Decay, October 12, 2012 
Fee, Brian "The Physicality of Place: Daniel Heidkamp at Champion”, New American Paintings, January 30, 2012 
Indrisek, Scott, “Big Picture”, Modern Painters Magazine, October 5, 2010 
Luse, Mimi, “Too Big To Fail: Big Paintings”, Art Paper Magazine, January 10, 2010 
McQuaid, Cate, “A Pleasing Visual Shock”, The Boston Globe, April 22, 2009 
Cotter, Holland, “Cleopatra’s Trade Secrets”, The New York Times, May 15, 2009 
Milella, Annalisa, “Artisti a New York, Io Donna, January 17, 2009 
Bowers, Katherine, “An Eye for Talent”, Boston Common, November 2008 
McQuaid, Kate, “Paradise Lost”, The Boston Globe, November 29, 2007 
Hopkins, Randi, “Knocking on Heavens Door”, Boston Phoenix, November 13, 2007 
Tranberg, Dan, “Caution: Fresh Painting at Front Room Gallery, Cleveland Plain Dealer, September 14, 2007

External links 
Loyal Gallery
Daniel Heidkamp: Artists’ website
The Journal Gallery
Half Gallery

References 

American abstract artists
Abstract painters
21st-century American painters
21st-century American male artists
American contemporary painters
Painters from New York (state)
1980 births
Living people